Artur Jorge Braga Melo Teixeira (born 13 February 1946), commonly known as Artur Jorge, is a Portuguese football manager and former player, who played as a forward.

Club career
As a junior player, Artur Jorge started at the junior team of FC Porto. As professional player, he played for Académica de Coimbra and Benfica, before ending his career at Belenenses in the 1977–78 season, due to a serious injury suffered at a training session in the Estádio Nacional where he broke a leg. He also had a stint in the North American Soccer League with the Rochester Lancers. During his playing days in Coimbra, Jorge was a student at the Faculty of Literature of the University of Coimbra, graduating in Germanic Philology from the University of Lisbon in 1975 during his time at Benfica. As a player, he won four Portuguese league championships, two Taça de Portugal cups and two silver boots for being the best goalscorer. He underwent knee surgery five times during his career, this is attributed as one of the causes of his declining abilities at the end of the career.

International career
Despite having been one of the top scorers at Benfica, the concurrence of other great forwards such as Eusébio, Rui Jordão and Nené largely limited Artur Jorge to only 16 caps for Portugal, earning two caps while at Académica, 13 at Benfica and one while playing for Belenenses, scoring only one goal during his international career. His debut, on 27 March 1967, was a 1–1 draw with Italy, in a friendly match, in Rome. His last match was on 30 March 1977, a 1–0 win over Switzerland in another friendly match, in Funchal, Madeira. He was a member of the squad that reached the Brazil Independence Cup final, in 1972, the highest point of his international career.

Managerial career
After his player career, Artur Jorge went to Leipzig, East Germany, to study football and training methodology.
He started his managerial career working with Vitória de Guimarães, moving on to Belenenses, Portimonense and then signing with Porto for the 1984–85 season, where he won three national champion titles and two Taça de Portugal titles. His greatest success was to win the European Cup with Porto over favourites Bayern Munich 2–1. Jorge is known since then as "Rei Artur" ("King Arthur"). He moved to Racing Paris the next season, and returned to Porto in 1989–90. He then moved to Paris Saint-Germain in 1991–92, where he won the national championship in 1993–94.

Artur Jorge moved to Benfica in 1994–95, finishing third with his team, and was replaced at the beginning of the following season. Since then, he has been coach of several other clubs including Académica de Coimbra, Vitesse Arnhem, Tenerife and CSKA Moscow. He managed the Portugal national team, initially while still Porto coach during the 1989–90 and 1990–91 seasons, and again during the 1996–97 season. He also managed the Switzerland team at UEFA Euro 1996, replacing Roy Hodgson under whom they had qualified. Since 2004 he managed Cameroon. He failed to lead his team to the 2006 FIFA World Cup. He managed Saudi club Al-Nasr for only two cup matches and was sacked following a 4–1 defeat by lowly club Al-Faisaly. He then managed French second division team Créteil in 2006–07.

On 27 November 2014, Artur Jorge joined Algerian club MC Alger, ending a seven-year period without coaching. That appointment ended on 8 October 2015.

Career statistics
Scores and results list Portugal's goal tally first, score column indicates score after each Artur Jorge goal.

Honours

Player
Benfica
 Primeira Liga: 1970–71, 1971–72, 1972–73, 1974–75
 Taça de Portugal: 1969–70, 1971–72

Individual
 Bola de Prata: 1970–71, 1971–72

Manager
Porto
 Primeira Liga: 1984–85, 1985–86, 1989–90
 Supertaça Cândido de Oliveira: 1984, 1986, 1990
 Taça de Portugal: 1990–91
 European Cup: 1987

Paris Saint-Germain
 Division 1: 1994
 Coupe de France: 1993

Al-Hilal
 Saudi Premier League: 2002
 Asian Cup Winners' Cup: 2002

CSKA Moscow
 Russian Super Cup: 2004

Individual
 European Coach of the Season: 1986–87

References

External links 
 
 

1946 births
Living people
Portuguese footballers
Portuguese football managers
Portuguese expatriate football managers
Footballers from Porto
Associação Académica de Coimbra – O.A.F. players
S.L. Benfica footballers
C.F. Os Belenenses players
Rochester Lancers (1967–1980) players
North American Soccer League (1968–1984) players
FC Porto managers
CD Tenerife managers
La Liga managers
Paris Saint-Germain F.C. managers
UEFA Euro 1996 managers
Portugal international footballers
Vitória S.C. managers
Associação Académica de Coimbra – O.A.F. managers
SBV Vitesse managers
Portugal national football team managers
Cameroon national football team managers
Switzerland national football team managers
Primeira Liga managers
PFC CSKA Moscow managers
Russian Premier League managers
US Créteil-Lusitanos managers
FC Porto players
Primeira Liga players
Al Hilal SFC managers
Ligue 1 managers
UEFA Champions League winning managers
Expatriate football managers in France
Expatriate football managers in the Netherlands
Expatriate football managers in Saudi Arabia
Expatriate football managers in Spain
Expatriate football managers in Switzerland
Expatriate football managers in Russia
Portuguese expatriate sportspeople in the Netherlands
Portuguese expatriate sportspeople in Russia
Al Nassr FC managers
Portimonense S.C. managers
Racing Club de France Football managers
University of Coimbra alumni
University of Lisbon alumni
2006 Africa Cup of Nations managers
Association football forwards
Portuguese expatriate sportspeople in Cameroon